Patricia Collins (born 1937) is a British-Canadian actress, prominently associated with the Stratford Festival.

Life and career
Collins was born and raised in Newcastle-upon-Tyne, England. After moving to Canada in the 1950s, she did amateur stage work and supported herself by selling sweaters in a department store and as a Simpson catalogue copy writer.

Beginning in 1963, she had various small parts in CBC Television anthology series such as Playdate and Festival before being cast in her breakthrough role as Marty, the wife of John Vernon's title character, in the drama series Wojeck.

Her performances at Stratford  included productions of King Lear (1985), A Comedy of Errors (1995), The Prime of Miss Jean Brodie (1998), The Night of the Iguana (1998), Pride and Prejudice (1999), Medea (2000), Tartuffe (2000), Present Laughter (2003), Gigi (2003), Anything Goes (2004), Guys and Dolls (2004), To Kill a Mockingbird (2007), Measure for Measure (2013), Mary Stuart (2013) and Christina, The Girl Queen (2014).

Her roles for other theatre companies have included Factory Theatre's production of George F. Walker's Beautiful City in 1987, Necessary Angel's production of Howard Barker's The Europeans in 1990, Tarragon Theatre's production of Judith Thompson's White Biting Dog in 1994, and Canadian Stage's production of Stephen Sondheim's A Little Night Music in 1995.

She appeared in the films Summer's Children, Bear Island, Nothing Personal, Phobia, Speaking Parts, Two Men, Where the Spirit Lives, The Adjuster and House, and the television series McQueen, The Whiteoaks of Jalna, King of Kensington, The Edison Twins, Street Legal, North of 60, Ready or Not, The Rez, This Is Wonderland, Heartland, and Murdoch Mysteries.

She received a Genie Award nomination for Best Supporting Actress at the 1st Genie Awards in 1980 for Summer's Children.

In television she was a Gemini Award nominee for Best Supporting Actress in a Drama Program or Series at the 4th Gemini Awards in 1989 for Two Men, and at the 13th Gemini Awards in 1998 for The Rez. She won Dora Mavor Moore Awards for Best Supporting Actress in 1990 for The Europeans, and Best Actress in 1994 for White Biting Dog.

Personal life
She married Bob Mitchell, graphic designer, artist and former jazz drummer.

References

External links

1937 births
Living people
20th-century British actresses
20th-century Canadian actresses
21st-century British actresses
21st-century Canadian actresses
British film actresses
British musical theatre actresses
British stage actresses
British television actresses
British emigrants to Canada
Canadian film actresses
Canadian musical theatre actresses
Canadian stage actresses
Canadian television actresses
Canadian Shakespearean actresses
Dora Mavor Moore Award winners
Actresses from Newcastle upon Tyne